The Wales national under-20 football team, controlled by the Football Association of Wales, is Wales' national under 20 football team and is considered to be a feeder team for the Wales national football team. The team represented Wales in the 2017 Toulon Tournament.

Squad 
The Wales squad for the 2017 Toulon Tournament was announced in May 2017. Players born between 1 January 1997 and 31 December 1999 were eligible for the tournament. Ben Woodburn and Harry Wilson were not available due to their inclusion in the Wales senior squad. Rhys Norrington-Davies, Mitch Clark, David Brooks, Aron Davies and Matthew Smith withdrew from the squad, and were replaced by Cian Harries, Aaron Lewis, Keiran Evans, Chris Mepham and Lloyd Humphries respectively. 

|-
!colspan="8" bgcolor="#B0D3FB"|
|- bgcolor="#DFEDFD"

|-
!colspan="10" bgcolor="#B0D3FB"|
|- bgcolor="#DFEDFD"

|-
!colspan="9" bgcolor="#B0D3FB"|
|- bgcolor="#DFEDFD"

See also
 Football Association of Wales
 Wales national football team
 Wales national under-21 football team
 Wales national under-19 football team
 Wales national under-18 football team
 Wales national under-17 football team

References

F
European national under-20 association football teams
Youth football in Wales